Joseph Girard may refer to:

Joseph Girard (Canadian politician) (1853–1933), Canadian politician
Joseph Girard (Swiss politician) (1815–1890), Swiss politician
Joseph Girard (historian) (1881–1962), French historian, librarian and museum curator
Joseph W. Girard (1871–1949), American actor
Joseph Girard III (born 2000) American basketball player